Kim Mi-jung (born 1977) is a South Korean sport shooter who competed in the 1998 Asian Games and won a bronze medal in 10 meter air pistol team event.

References

1977 births
Living people
South Korean female sport shooters
ISSF pistol shooters
Shooters at the 1998 Asian Games
Asian Games medalists in shooting
Asian Games bronze medalists for South Korea
Medalists at the 1998 Asian Games
20th-century South Korean women
21st-century South Korean women